The Covenant Reformed Presbyterian Church (CRPC) - is a Presbyterian denomination, formed in 1997, by churches that separated from the Presbyterian Church in America, for defending the theonomy.

History 

The Presbyterian churches originate from the Protestant Reformation of the 16th century. It is the Christian churches Protestant that adhere to Reformed theology and whose ecclesiastical government is characterized by the government of an assembly of elders. Government Presbyterian is common in Protestant churches that were modeled after the Reformation Protestant Switzerland, notably in Switzerland, Scotland, Netherlands,  France and portions of Prussia, of Ireland and, later, of United States.

In 1997, a group of churches split from Presbyterian Church in America and formed the Covenant Reformed Presbyterian Church. The main cause of their separation was the defense of theonomy by these churches.

A church in Suriname, originally Baptist and later linked to Orthodox Presbyterian Church, joined the denomination after its organization.

Attempt to merge 

In 2004 the CRPC held a joint meeting with the Reformed Presbyterian Church - Hanover Presbytery, another conservative denomination in United States, aiming at a union. However, conflicts over the government of the denomination by a higher court and the Hanover Presbytery's tolerance for members to participate in Freemasonry prevented the union.

In 2004, the Covenanting Association of Reformed and Presbyterian Churches and American Reformation Presbyterian Church sent delegates to meetings of the Presbytery of the CRPC. However, the union was also not accepted between the denominations.

Separation 

In 2006, one of its churches split from the denomination and formed the Westminster Presbyterian Church in the United States.

Doctrine 

The denomination subscribes to Westminster Confession of Faith, Westminster Larger Catechism and Westminster Shorter Catechism. It differs from other Presbyterians only in its defense of theonomy.

References 

Presbyterian denominations in the United States
Presbyterian denominations established in the 20th century
Christian organizations established in 1997